Dumontville is an unincorporated community in Fairfield County, in the U.S. state of Ohio.

History
A post office called Dumontville was established in 1837, and remained in operation until 1903. The community was named for James Dumont, a first settler.

References

Unincorporated communities in Fairfield County, Ohio
Unincorporated communities in Ohio